Gilius van Bergeijk (born The Hague, 7 November 1946) is a Dutch composer.

Taught by Kees van Baaren and Dick Raaymakers (electronic music), Gilius van Bergeijk is a highly respected teacher at the Royal Conservatory of The Hague. Van Bergeijk also studied oboe and alto saxophone, playing with Peter Brötzmann in the Instant Composers Pool orchestra.

Many of his works focus on the transformation of familiar materials through deconstructive formal processes. 
Some of his better known works include: 
6 Piano installations.
On Death and Time 1980 (for electronic instruments, piano, organ contralto voice)
Symphony of a 1000 (alphabetically)
BAC 1968-1970 for Barrel organ

Notable students include Richard Ayres, Allison Cameron, Kristoffer Zegers, Sinta Wullur, Frank Martinez and many other composition students who have passed through the Royal Conservatory of the Hague. 
Van Bergeijk is also an avid cyclist and speed-skater.

References

Mens performed at the Night of the Unexpected Festival

1946 births
Living people
20th-century classical composers
Dutch male classical composers
Dutch classical composers
Musicians from The Hague
Academic staff of the Royal Conservatory of The Hague
20th-century Dutch male musicians